Rhamdia is a genus of three-barbeled catfishes found in Mexico, Central and South America. These catfishes are nocturnal, opportunistic carnivores, found in a wide range of freshwater habitats. This genus includes a number of troglobitic members, encompassing a number of taxa, including R. enfurnada, R. guasarensis, R. laluchensis, R. laticauda, R. macuspanensis, R. quelen, R. reddelli and R. zongolicensis. In a few of these only some of their populations are troglobitic.

Species
There are currently 26 recognized species in this genus:
 Rhamdia argentina (Humboldt, 1821)
 Rhamdia branneri Haseman, 1911 
 Rhamdia cinerascens (Günther, 1860) 
 Rhamdia enfurnada Bichuette & Trajano, 2005
 Rhamdia foina (J. P. Müller & Troschel, 1849)
 Rhamdia guasarensis DoNascimiento, Provenzano & Lundberg, 2004
 Rhamdia guatemalensis (Günther, 1864) 
 Rhamdia humilis (Günther, 1864) 
 Rhamdia itacaiunas Silfvergrip, 1996
 Rhamdia jequitinhonha Silfvergrip, 1996
 Rhamdia laluchensis A. Weber, Allegrucci & Sbordoni, 2003 (La Lucha blind catfish)
 Rhamdia laticauda (Kner, 1858) (File-spine chulín)
 Rhamdia laukidi Bleeker, 1858
 Rhamdia macuspanensis A. Weber & Wilkens, 1998 (Olmec blind catfish)
 Rhamdia muelleri (Günther, 1864)
 Rhamdia nicaraguensis (Günther, 1864)
 Rhamdia parryi C. H. Eigenmann & R. S. Eigenmann, 1888 (Tonala catfish)
 Rhamdia poeyi C. H. Eigenmann & R. S. Eigenmann, 1888
 Rhamdia quelen (Quoy & Gaimard, 1824) (Silver catfish)
 Rhamdia reddelli R. R. Miller, 1984 (Blind-whiskered catfish)
 Rhamdia saijaensis Rendahl (de), 1941 
 Rhamdia schomburgkii Bleeker, 1858
 Rhamdia velifer (Humboldt, 1821)
 Rhamdia voulezi Haseman, 1911 
 Rhamdia xetequepeque Silfvergrip, 1996
 Rhamdia zongolicensis Wilkens, 1993 (Zongolica catfish)

References

External links
 

Heptapteridae
Catfish genera
Taxa named by Pieter Bleeker
Freshwater fish genera
Taxonomy articles created by Polbot